Carl Sandburg Bibliography

Collections of Poetry
 In Reckless Ecstasy (Asgard Press, 1904).
 Incidentals (Asgard Press, 1904).
 The Plaint of the Rose (Asgard Press, 1908).
 Chicago Poems (Henry Holt, 1916).
 Chicago
 Cornhuskers (Henry Holt, 1918).
 Smoke and Steel (Harcourt Brace, 1920).
 Slabs of the Sunburnt West (1922).* Bronze Wood (Grabhorn Press, 1941).
 Poems of the Midwest (World Publishing, 1946).
 The Complete Poems of Carl Sandburg (Harcourt Brace, 1950).
 Harvest Poems (Harcourt Brace, 1960).
 Six New Poems and a Parable (University of Kentucky Press, 1961).
 Honey and Salt (Harcourt Brace, 1963).
 A Sandburg Treasury (Harcourt Brace, 1970).
 Breathing Tokens (Harcourt Brace, 1978).
 Fables, Foibles and Foobles (University of Illinois Press, 1989).
 Arithmetic (Harcourt, 1993).
 Billy Sunday and Other Poems (Harcourt Brace, 1993).
 Selected Poems of Carl Sandburg (Harcourt Brace, 1996).

Prose: Biographies, Autobiographies, and Sundry
 You and Your Job (Charles H. Kerr & Company, 1908).
 Abraham Lincoln: The Prairie Years (Harcourt Brace, 1926).
 The American Songbag (Harcourt Brace, 1927).
 Mary Lincoln: Wife and Widow (Harcourt Brace, 1932).
 Abraham Lincoln: The War Years (Harcourt Brace, 1939).
 Storm over the Land (Harcourt Brace, 1942).
 Home Front Memo (Harcourt Brace, 1943).
 Remembrance Rock (Harcourt Brace, 1948).
 Lincoln Collector (Harcourt Brace, 1949).
 The New American Songbag (Broadcast Music, 1950).
 Always the Young Strangers (Harcourt Brace, 1953).
 A Lincoln Preface (Harcourt Brace, 1953).
 Abraham Lincoln: The Prairie Years and the War Years (Harcourt Brace, 1954).
 The Letters of Carl Sandburg (Harcourt Brace, 1968).
 The Chicago Race Riots of 1919 (Harcourt, Brace and Howe, 1969).
 Ever the Winds of Chance (University of Illinois Press, 1983).
 Carl Sandburg at the Movies (Scarecrow Press, 1985).
 The Poet and the Dream Girl: The Love Letters of Lilian Steichen & Carl Sandburg (University of Illinois Press, 1987).
 The Movies Are: Carl Sandburg's Film Reviews and Essays (Lake Claremont Press, 2000).
 The Sandburg Range (Harvest Books, 2001).

Children's books
 Rootabaga Stories (Harcourt Brace, 1922).
 Rootabaga Pigeons (Harcourt Brace, 1923).
 Abe Lincoln Grows Up (Harcourt Brace, 1928).
 Early Moon (Junior Literary Guild, 1930).
 Potato Face (Harcourt Brace, 1930).
 Prairie-Town Boy (Harcourt Brace, 1955).
 Wind Song (Harcourt Brace, 1960).
 The Wedding Procession of the Rag doll and the Broom Handle and Who Was in It (Harcourt Brace, 1967).
 The Sandburg Treasury (Harcourt Brace, 1970).
 Rainbows Are Made (Harcourt Brace, 1982).
 More Rootabagas (Alfred A. Knopf, 1993).

External links

Bibliographies by writer
Bibliographies of American writers
Children's literature bibliographies
Poetry bibliographies
Works by Carl Sandburg